Nowosiółki  is a village in the administrative district of Gmina Chełm, within Chełm County, Lublin Voivodeship, in eastern Poland. The population is 192 people (as of 2011).

History 
From 1975 to 1998, the village was administratively attached to the Voivodeship of Chełm.

Since 1999 it has been part of the Lublin Voivodeship.

Proper Name 
Initially, in 1564 the name appears as Nowosielce, as Nowoszolky in 1589, and as Nowosielce Chełmskie in 1796, then in modern times was transformed by derivation into Nowosiółki.

Demography 
Demographic structure as of March 31, 2011:

As of September 10, 1921, the village had 37 houses and 217 inhabitants, of whom:

 110 men and 107 women;
 132 Orthodox Christians, 85 Roman Catholics;
 131 Ukrainians (Ruthenians), 86 Poles.

References

Villages in Chełm County